The Cuckoos is a 1949 German comedy drama film directed by Hans Deppe and starring Ina Halley, Rainer Penkert and Carsta Löck. It was shot at the Babelsberg Studios in East Berlin. The film was made in the Soviet Zone, in what would soon become East Germany. The film's sets were designed by the art director Wilhelm Vorwerg.

Cast
 Ina Halley as Inge Kuckert
 Rainer Penkert as Hanno Gersdorf
 Günther Güssefeldt as Heinz Krüger
 Aribert Wäscher as Eberhard Schultz
 Carsta Löck as Wanda Merian - Kunstgewerblerin
 Hans Neie as Rolf Kuckert
 Gertrud Wolle as Frau Poehler - die Wirtin
 Marlise Ludwig as Frau Bissig
 Heinz Schröder as Max Kuckert
 Nils-Peter Mahlau as Manfred Kuckert - Genannt Moritz
 Regine Fischer as Evchen Kuckert
 Thomas Dunskus as Erwin - Maurerlehrling
 Knut Hartwig as Meister Miericke
 Günther Klapp as Klaus - Tischlerlehrling
 Michael Klein-Chevalier as Heini - Klemplerlehrling
 Klaus Deppe as Ferdinand - Schlosserlehrling
 Horst Günter Fiegler as Egon - Radiomechanikerlehrling
 Elly Burgmer as Jugendfürsorgerin
 Liselotte Lieck as Dame in der Leihbibliothek
 Erich Dunskus as Maurer
 Karl Hannemann as Wirt der 'Goldenen Traube'
 Albert Johannes as Leiter der Jugendfürsorge
 Otto Matthies as Oberkellner
 Hans Joachim Schölermann as Schimkat
 Walter Strasen as Polizist
 Maria Grünfeld as Frau Nobel
 Hilde Sonntag as Frau Pinselig
 Isolde Laugs as Frau Zottel
 Eleonore Tappert as Frau Dickbein
 Johannes Bergfeldt as Herr Hahn
 Nora Boltenhagen as Stenotypistin
 Käthe Jöken-König as Krügers Wirtin
 Fritz Bohnstedt as Maurer
 Maria Hofen
 Hans Deppe
 Herbert Weissbach
 Willi Wietfeldt
 Georg Helge
 Ingrid Pankow
 Gerda Müller
 Siegfried Andrich
 Meta Rodrich

References

Bibliography
 Karl, Lars & Skopal, Pavel. Cinema in Service of the State: Perspectives on Film Culture in the GDR and Czechoslovakia, 1945–1960. Berghahn Books, 2015.
 Pinkert, Anke. Film and Memory in East Germany. Indiana University Press, 2008.

External links 
 

1949 films
1949 comedy-drama films
German comedy-drama films
East German films
1940s German-language films
Films directed by Hans Deppe
Films shot at Babelsberg Studios
German black-and-white films
1940s German films